Leptotes pulcher, the beautiful zebra blue, is a butterfly of the family Lycaenidae. It is found in Africa south of the Sahara.

The wingspan is 18–24 mm for males and 18–26 mm for females. Adults are on wing year-round, with a peak from November to May in the north and probably only the warmer months in South Africa.

The larvae feed on Sesbania aegyptica and Sesbania sesban.

References

Butterflies described in 1874
Leptotes (butterfly)
Taxa named by Richard Paget Murray
Butterflies of Africa